Gary Lee Usher (December 14, 1938 – May 25, 1990) was an American rock musician, songwriter, and record producer, who worked with numerous California acts in the 1960s, including the Byrds, the Beach Boys, and Dick Dale. Usher also produced fictitious surf groups or hot rod groups, mixing studio session musicians with his own troops (Chuck Girard, Dick Burns and others). These bands included the Super-Stocks, with the hot-rod song "Midnight Run", and the Kickstands.

Death
Usher died of lung cancer at his home in his hometown of Los Angeles, California, on May 25, 1990 at the age of 51.

Selected discography

Production

Go Little Honda (1964, The Hondells)
Hondells (1964, The Hondells)
Hit City '65 (1965, The Surfaris)
It Ain't Me, Babe (1965, The Surfaris)
In Action (1966, Keith Allison)
An Esoteric Qabalistic Service (1966, Rev. Ann Davies with the Builders of the Adytum Choir)
Gene Clark with the Gosdin Brothers (1967, Gene Clark)
Younger Than Yesterday (1967, The Byrds)
The Peanut Butter Conspiracy Is Spreading (1967, The Peanut Butter Conspiracy)
Of Cabbages and Kings (1967, Chad & Jeremy)
The Great Conspiracy (1967, The Peanut Butter Conspiracy)
Present Tense (1968, Sagittarius)
The Ark (1968, Chad & Jeremy)
The Notorious Byrd Brothers (1968, The Byrds)
Waiting for the Electrician or Someone Like Him (1968, The Firesign Theatre)
Sweetheart of the Rodeo (1968, The Byrds)
Wackering Heights (1972, The Wackers)
Going Public (1977, Bruce Johnston)
"Sanctuary" (1984, Celestium)

Songwriting

"409" (1962, The Beach Boys)
"Lonely Sea" (1962, The Beach Boys)
"Ten Little Indians" (1962, The Beach Boys)
"In My Room" (1963, The Beach Boys)
"Malibu Sunset" (1963, The Beach Boys)
"Beach Party" (1963, Frankie Avalon)
"Mag Wheels" (1963, Dick Dale and the Del-Tones)
"We'll Run Away" (1964, The Beach Boys)
"Comin' On Too Strong" (1965, Wayne Newton)
"The Truth Is Not Real" (1968, Sagittarius)
"The Blue Marble" (1969, Sagittarius)
"Don't Give In to Him" (1969, Gary Puckett & The Union Gap)
"(Friend)Ships" (1971, Gary Usher)
"Sanctuary" (1983, Celestium and later Laura Branigan and the J-Pop artist Reimy)
"Let's Go To Heaven In My Car" (1986, Brian Wilson) (Note - Gary Usher's son, Gary Usher Jr., played the guitar solo)
"Christmas Time" (1986, Brian Wilson)
 "Let's Put the Fun Back in Rock'n Roll" (1986 co-written with Joseph Nicoletti Jr.) - Recorded by Frankie Avalon, Fabian & Bobby Rydell; "The Golden Boys of Rock"

References

Further reading

External links

1938 births
1990 deaths
People from Grafton, Massachusetts
Surf music record producers
Record producers from Los Angeles
American rock musicians
Songwriters from Massachusetts
The Forte' Four members
Deaths from lung cancer in California
20th-century American musicians
20th-century American businesspeople
California Sound